Allan Brown may refer to:

 Allan Brown (Australian footballer) (1924–2014), Australian footballer for Collingwood
 Allan Brown (footballer, born 1926) (1926–2011), Scottish former footballer and manager
 Allan Brown (soccer) (born 1984), South African-born Canadian soccer player
 Allan Brown (RAAF officer) (1895–1964), World War I flying ace
 Allan Brown (water polo) (born 1937), South African Olympic water polo player
 Allan Lister Samuel Brown (1917–1985), politician in Saskatchewan, Canada
 Allan Percy Brown (1912–1994), merchant, boxer and political figure in Saskatchewan

See also
 Alan Browne (born 1974), Irish hurler
 Alan Brown (disambiguation)
 Allen Brown (1943–2020), American football player
 Allen W. Brown (1909–1990), Episcopal bishop in America